is a Junior high school and High school in Ōita, Ōita, Japan. 
The school opened in April 1986, and the junior high school was added in April 2007.

External links
  

Educational institutions established in 1986
Schools in Ōita Prefecture
Education in Ōita Prefecture
1986 establishments in Japan